Elena Dorfman (born Boston, Massachusetts, United States) is an American fine art photographer based in Los Angeles, California.  She has published photographs in The New Yorker, The New York Times, T, and W.

Career
Elena Dorfman received a bachelor's degree from Sarah Lawrence College. Elena Dorfman's photography series explores cultural tensions between the artificial and natural, animal and human, fantasy and reality. Known for research-led works in photography, film, and most recently, tapestry, she conducts extensive field studies that have inspired series including Valbona, Sublime: The LA River, Empire Falling, The Pleasure Park, Fandomania: Characters & Cosplay, and Still Lovers. 

Her work has been exhibited throughout the U.S. and Europe including the Fondazione Prada in Milan, Italy, and the San Francisco Museum of Modern Art, and is the subject of three monographs: Empire Falling (Damiani, 2013); Fandomania (Aperture, 2007); Still Lovers (Channel, 2005). Dorfman’s work from Still Lovers was the focus of several documentary films and the inspiration for the feature film, Lars and the Real Girl. In 2022, the U.S. Embassy in Tirana, Albania, supported her research and restoration work in the National Film Archives to create 'Fragments', a single-channel film installation.

Her work is held in many public and private collections. She is represented by Robischon Gallery, Modernism, Frederic Snitzer Gallery, and the Edwynn Houk Gallery.

References

External links
 Elena Dorfman's website

Year of birth missing (living people)
Living people
American photographers
American women photographers
Sarah Lawrence College alumni
Fine art photographers
21st-century American women